Cassie Mitchell (born June 8, 1981) is an American engineer and Paralympic cyclist and track and field athlete.

Early life
Mitchell was born in Muskogee, Oklahoma, and graduated from high school in Warner in 1999 as valedictorian of her class; shortly thereafter, she developed neuromyelitis optica, which left her paralyzed from the chest down with limited movement of her arms and hands and with permanent double vision. In 2004, she graduated from Oklahoma State University with a BS degree in chemical engineering. She later earned a PhD in biomedical engineering from both Emory and Georgia Tech universities.

Academic career
Currently, she is a research professor at Wallace H. Coulter Department of Biomedical Engineering at both universities.

Paralympic career
Mitchell won a silver medal at the 2011 IPC World Championships and the same year won five gold medals at the UCI World Para-cycling Championships and National Para-cycling Championships. In 2010, she won the national Para-cycling Championships for H1 criterium. She holds American and world records in multiple track and field events and medaled in discus throw and club throw at the 2016 Rio Paralympics. She placed fourth in the 100 m, 200 m and discus throw at the 2012 Paralympics.

References

External links

American female cyclists
American female discus throwers
Track and field athletes with disabilities
Paralympic track and field athletes of the United States
Athletes (track and field) at the 2012 Summer Paralympics
Athletes (track and field) at the 2016 Summer Paralympics
Athletes (track and field) at the 2020 Summer Paralympics
Sportspeople from Muskogee, Oklahoma
Track and field athletes from Oklahoma
1981 births
Living people
21st-century American women scientists
Scientists from Oklahoma
Oklahoma State University alumni
Emory University alumni
Georgia Tech alumni
Emory University faculty
Georgia Tech faculty
American biomedical engineers
Medalists at the 2016 Summer Paralympics
Medalists at the 2020 Summer Paralympics
Paralympic medalists in athletics (track and field)
Paralympic silver medalists for the United States
Paralympic bronze medalists for the United States
Medalists at the 2015 Parapan American Games
American women academics
Cyclists from Oklahoma
Wheelchair discus throwers
Club throwers
Paralympic discus throwers
Paralympic club throwers